Coat of arms of the city of Turku is based on a medieval seal dating back to 1309. Gothic letter "A" is based on the Latin name of the city, "Aboa". Lily is a symbol often depicted on coats of arms and it symbolises the Virgin Mary, to whom the Turku Cathedral is consecrated to. The coat of arms includes the letters "A" and "M" merged, symbolising Ave Maria.

References

Turku
Turku